Gosthi or Guthi (Newar: ,; etymologically from ) is a social organization that maintains the socio-economic order of Nepalese society. The guṭhī system is considered to be in operation since the Kirati era, like king Yalamber's descendants and later adopted by the Lichchhavi during the Lichchhavi era, with the first practice being recorded in scriptures on pillars erected at Changu Narayan temple, which is regarded as the oldest dated inscription of Nepal.  

Currently, most of the guṭhīs are either defunct or a vestigial representation of what used to be the most powerful organized community of the Newars. However, some of these guṭhīs still exist with its own purpose, and their functions are governed by internal unwritten rules; often kept secret and revealed only to its members. During the course of time, the male family members (often the bloodline) of pre-existing members are handed out the responsibilities associated with the guṭhī.

Organizational structure 
Guthi is an important social organization prevalent among the Newars. It is believed to have started during the Kirat or Lichchavi period. Guthi is traditionally a patriarchal kinship based on certain norms that are moderated by the guṭhī system. It consists of a Thakali, or the eldest person of the guṭhī. The consent of the thakali is essential for the formulation of most of the norms of the guṭhī. Guthi is a form of institutional landownership, the religious and charitable aspects of which have given rise to special problems and characteristics in the fields of land tenure and taxation.

Role in society 

Guthi have played an important role in maintaining harmony in the Newar society.

Guthi is a system that has been part of the Newar social system in the Kathmandu Valley since the 5th century BC. The Guthi system is a trust, whereby land is donated to this trust. This revenue is also used to carry out various festivals, customs, rites and rituals. It was a system that correlated with the local community in terms of not only tilling the land but also engaging a group of people such as masons, Shilpakars (Natives Newar who worked on Mandir, Stupas, Temples in Kirat and Lichhavi periods, Shilpa is Artis). They carved wood, metal, copper in temples around Lalitpur, Bhaktapur and Kathmandu, and helped them develop their skill. Additionally, it not only benefited the local community financially thanks to the revenue generation but also provided a framework, which the local community used in order to protect its tangible and intangible culture, enabling it to protect its very identity.

According to Newari or Nepalese culture, donating land to the Guthi is considered to be a very good deed and is believed to have religious merits. Historically, kings, royals, and ordinary people would donate land to the Guthi with the belief that it would bring spiritual deliverance for seven generations. The donation of land to the Guthi was also a symbol of status in society and was highly regarded. Furthermore, another reason for endowment was to prevent the State from confiscating property as it was considered a great crime to confiscate Guthi land. All these reasons helped with the pool of land within these Guthi areas which were then used as a base on which regular income could be generated and various tasks could be carried out.

The Guthi system was basically associations formed by groups of people based often on various castes, which were formed in the past based on occupations. Guthis existed for the Gods, the living and the dead and all activities concerning these three themes were carried out by the members of the Guthis. Although most of the Guthi system is now slowly becoming lost due to changes in the social structure of communities and more so due to significant changes in the past fifty years, such as the nationalization of the Guthi System and land reform campaigns, many Guthis still exist although the activities that they conduct have diminished considerably.

The Guthi system is integrated into the social structure of the communities and hence was not only successful but also highly sustainable. It is a system like no other in the world and can be highlighted as a model of a system that worked not only to preserve tangible but also intangible aspects of culture within the Kathmandu Valley.

Guthi Bill Protest 2019 

The "Guthi Bill", tabled in the Upper House of the Federal Parliament of Nepal in April 2019, was highly controversial and prompted a number of mass protests against the bill, especially in the Kathmandu Valley. Guthi came into being when people realized the importance of working and living together, of setting and working toward common goals. The member of Guthi are called Guthiyars.

See also
Guthi bill

References

Citations
 
Bernhard Kölver and Hemraj Śakya, Documents from the Rudravarna-Mahävihära, Pätan. 1. Sales and Mortgages (1985), esp. disc. on pp. 18–21.
U. N. Sinha, Development of Panchayats in Nepal (Patna, 1973), chapter IV.
Mary Slusser in Nepal Maṇḍala (1982).
John K. Locke, Buddhist Monasteries of Nepal (Kathmandu: Sahayogi Press, 1985), esp. pp. 10, 14, and passim.
Phanindra Ratna Vajracharya, "Role of Guthi in Newar Buddhist Culture” (1998 conference paper summary).

Newar
Kathmandu
History of Nepal
Newar language